Statistics of UAE Football League for the 1993–94 season.

Overview
It was contested by 10 teams, and Sharjah FC won the championship.

League standings

References
United Arab Emirates - List of final tables (RSSSF)

UAE Pro League seasons
United
1993–94 in Emirati football